Syzygium ripicola is a species of small tree in the "water apple / wax apple" genus Syzygium of the family Myrtaceae. Vietnamese names (including synonyms) may be trâm suối, trâm nước (or for synonym S. cochinchinense: trâm nam bộ) and it is found especially in Đồng Nai province; no subspecies are listed in the Plants of the World Online.

As its scientific and Vietnamese names suggest, this species is often associated with riparian areas. This is a small tree with red fruit, often branched in groups of three, 10–13 mm long.

References

External links
 </ref>

ripicola
Flora of Indo-China